The San Pablo Formation is a Late/Upper Miocene epoch geologic formation of the East Bay region in the San Francisco Bay Area, California.

It is found on the south shore of San Pablo Bay, in western Contra Costa County.

Geology
It is series of marine sandstones with tuffs and ashes. Its subunits, listed alphabetically, are Briones Sandstone, Cierbo Sandstone, Neroly Sandstone, and underlies the Pinole Tuff Formation.

It preserves fossils dating back to the Neogene period.

See also

 
 List of fossiliferous stratigraphic units in California
 Paleontology in California

References

Miocene California
Geology of Contra Costa County, California
San Pablo Bay
Geologic formations of California
Messinian
Tortonian
Tuff formations
Miocene Series of North America